|}

This is a list of electoral division results for the Australian 1929 federal election.

New South Wales

Barton

Calare

Cook

Cowper

Dalley

Darling

East Sydney

Eden-Monaro

Gwydir

Hume

Hunter

Lang

Macquarie

Martin

New England

Newcastle

North Sydney

Parkes

Parramatta

Reid

Richmond

Riverina

Robertson

South Sydney

Warringah

Wentworth

Werriwa

West Sydney

Victoria

Balaclava

Ballaarat

Batman

Bendigo

Bourke

Corangamite

Corio

Echuca

Fawkner

Flinders

Gippsland

Henty

Indi

Kooyong

Maribyrnong

Melbourne

Melbourne Ports

Wannon

Wimmera

Yarra

Queensland

Brisbane

Capricornia

Darling Downs

Herbert

Kennedy

Lilley

Maranoa

Moreton

Oxley

Wide Bay

South Australia

Adelaide

Angas

Barker

Boothby

Grey

Hindmarsh

Wakefield

Western Australia

Forrest

Fremantle

Kalgoorlie

Perth

Swan

Tasmania

Bass

Darwin

Denison

Franklin

Wilmot

Northern Territory

Northern Territory

See also 

 Candidates of the 1929 Australian federal election
 Members of the Australian House of Representatives, 1929–1931

References 

House of Representatives 1929